Daniel Edwin Barker (born June 25, 1949) is an American atheist activist and musician who served as an evangelical Christian preacher and composer for 19 years but left Christianity in 1984. He and his wife Annie Laurie Gaylor are the current co-presidents of the Freedom From Religion Foundation, and he is cofounder of The Clergy Project.  He has written numerous articles for Freethought Today, an American freethought newspaper. He is the author of several books including Losing Faith in Faith: From Preacher to Atheist.

Barker has been an invited speaker at Rock Beyond Belief. He is on the speakers bureau of the Secular Student Alliance.

Biography
Barker received a degree in religion from Azusa Pacific University and was ordained to the ministry by the Standard Community Church, California, in 1975. He served as associate pastor at several churches: Religious Society of Friends (Quaker), a church in the Assemblies of God fellowship, and an independent Charismatic church. He receives royalties from his popular children's Christian musicals, Mary Had a Little Lamb (1977) and His Fleece Was White as Snow (1978), both published by Manna Music.

In 1984, he announced to his friends, family, and co-ministers that he became an atheist, and appeared on AM Chicago (hosted by Oprah Winfrey) later that year on a show about "kicking the religion habit".

Personal life
Barker and Gaylor met when both were guests on the show. They began dating six months later and married in 1987. They have a daughter, Sabrina Delata.

He is a member of the Lenni Lenape Delaware Tribe of Indians, and in 1991 edited and published Paradise Remembered, a collection of his grandfather's stories as a Lenape boy in Indian Territory.

Barker belongs to a number of high-IQ societies, including the Prometheus Society.

Freedom From Religion Foundation

He is the current co-president with his wife Annie Laurie Gaylor of the Freedom From Religion Foundation, an American freethought organization that promotes the separation of church and state. Barker is co-host of Freethought Radio, a radio program based in Madison, Wisconsin for atheists, agnostics, and other freethinkers that began in 2006 and has included interviews with Richard Dawkins, Sam Harris, Steven Pinker, Christopher Hitchens, Philip Pullman, Daniel C. Dennett, Julia Sweeney, and Michael Newdow.

Media appearances

Barker has appeared on dozens of national television and radio programs to discuss and debate issues related to atheism and the separation of state and church. He has discussed nativity scenes on government property, the campaign against a Mother Teresa stamp, prayer in public schools, and has appeared on Oprah Winfrey, The O’Reilly Factor, Tucker Carlson, Laura Ingraham, Phil Donahue, Hannity & Colmes, Maury Povich, Good Morning America, Sally Jessy Raphael, and Tom Leykis, as well as many international television and radio shows.

He was featured in a New York Times article about the growth of atheism in Southern states, has given addresses on his own "de-conversion" across the United States, and has participated in more than 125 debates around the country.

Barker and his wife host a weekly one-hour radio program, Freethought Radio. It is carried on several stations throughout the Midwest and is available through podcast.

Publications
Musicals
Mary Had a Little Lamb (Manna Music 1977)
His Fleece Was White as Snow (Manna Music 1978)
Books

 

Music albums
Night at Nakoma (2008, piano solo)
Friendly Neighborhood Atheist (2002, FFRF album)
Beware of Dogma (2004, FFRF album)
Adrift On A Star (2013, FFRF album)

References

External links 

 Freedom From Religion Foundation 
 Freethought Radio

1949 births
20th-century atheists
21st-century atheists
American atheism activists
American atheist writers
American Assemblies of God pastors
American performers of Christian music
American secularists
American former Protestants
American jazz pianists
Atheism in the United States
Atheist philosophers
Azusa Pacific University alumni
Christ myth theory proponents
Critics of religions
Critics of Christianity
Critics of the Catholic Church
Delaware Tribe of Indians people
Freethought writers
Former Baptists
Former Pentecostals
Former Quakers
Living people
New Atheism
Writers from Madison, Wisconsin
Writers about religion and science
People from Santa Monica, California
Quaker ministers